Neider dos Santos (born 1964/1965) is a Brazilian football coach.

Career

Dos Santos started his managerial career with the Vasco da Gama youth teams.

He has previously managed Simba SC in Tanzania, as well as the youth teams of Brazilian clubs Vasco da Gama and Botafogo, plus the national teams of Cayman Islands and Guyana. Dos Santos took over as manager of Jamaican club Village United in late 2010, having spent the previous four years as manager of the Bahamas national team. After leaving Jamaican club Village United in early 2011, Dos Santos was hired by newly promoted Montego Bay United in October 2011. By September 2012 he was the club's Technical Director.

He became manager of Ethiopian club Saint George in 2014, and was still in charge of them in May 2017.

References

1960s births
Living people
Brazilian football managers
Cayman Islands national football team managers
Guyana national football team managers
Simba S.C. managers
Bahamas national football team managers
Saint George S.C. managers
Brazilian expatriate football managers
Brazilian expatriate sportspeople in the Cayman Islands
Expatriate football managers in the Cayman Islands
Brazilian expatriate sportspeople in Guyana
Expatriate football managers in Guyana
Brazilian expatriate sportspeople in Tanzania
Expatriate football managers in Tanzania
Brazilian expatriate sportspeople in the Bahamas
Expatriate football managers in the Bahamas
Expatriate football managers in Jamaica
Brazilian expatriate sportspeople in Jamaica
Expatriate football managers in Ethiopia
Brazilian expatriate sportspeople in Ethiopia
Ethiopian Premier League managers